John Swan may refer to:

John Swan (engineer) (1787–1869), British marine engineer, pioneer of the screw propeller and inventor of the self-acting chain messenger
John Swan (Bermudian politician) (born 1935), British-Bermudian politician
John Swan (British politician) (1877–1956), British Labour Party politician
John Macallan Swan (1846–1910), English painter and sculptor
John Swan (architect) (1874–1936), New Zealand architect
John Swan (cricketer) (1848–1924), English cricketer
John Swan (priest), Anglican Anglican; Archdeacon of Lilley and of Brisbane
John Swan (born 1952), Scottish-Australian singer, also known as Swanee
John Swan (Neighbours), fictional character in Australian soap opera Neighbours

See also
John Swann (disambiguation)
John F. De Swan (1876–1956), United States Army private and Medal of Honor recipient